The ALCO 251 is a 4-stroke diesel engine that was developed by the American Locomotive Company to replace its 244 and 539 engines. The 251 was developed to be used in diesel locomotives, as a marine power plant in ships, and as a stationary power generator.

Development
Its designation combines Alco's identifier for that bore and stroke - 2 - with the year its design was approved for laboratory testing - 1951. Chief Engineer of Diesel Engine Design, Paul Vaughan, designed the 251 to improve upon the major weaknesses of the 244. A wet block design was used to overcome severe thermal differences which existed in the dry block 244. The welded block and base was kept, as was the four-point mounting. New in the 251 was an intercooler for the turbocharger, which minimized temperature differentials and also benefited performance. Many small improvements were made to the crankshaft, bearings, pistons, injectors and camshafts.

To avoid the problems caused by rushing the 244 into production, the 251 was put through an extensive testing process. A simple, safe design, it also offered a direct replacement for the aged 539, which was still used in switch engines and the ALCO RS-1 road switcher. Like the 539, it was produced in Auburn, New York. In August 1951, Alco built the ALCO DL420 test unit with a six-cylinder 800-horsepower 251 engine. Ten GE 78-ton units followed in mid-1953 and were exported to the Consolidated Railroads of Cuba. The following year seven ALCO S-5, a demonstrator and six units for the Boston and Maine were built. Two GE X3341s were built in 1954 for the White Pass and Yukon Route with the 251 engines. In mid-1954 the Lehigh Valley Railroad supplied an FA-2 and FB-2 for installation of test 12-cylinder 251A engines. The Lehigh Valley units were tested for a year.  

In 1954, the 251 went into production with the inline-6 at Auburn, New York. The next year production of the V-12 followed at Auburn, New York - where the 539 engine was built - and a V-16 version built at Schenectady, New York, replacing the 244.

Power generation

The inline-6 designs of  version of the 251 engine replaced the 539 engine in 1954 in Alco's low-end line of power generation packages. The 244 engine was still used in higher-end power generation packages until it too was replaced by 251-engined power generation equipment in 1956.

A pair of Alco 251C engines is also used for powering the  NASA Crawler Transporter that transport rockets and their platforms from the Vehicle Assembly Building to the Launch Complex 39.

Ultimately a refined and successful design, the 251 outlived Alco. For a time it was built in Canada by Montreal Locomotive Works. As of September 2020, Fairbanks Morse still lists the 251 on its website for power generation.

North American locomotive uses

References

 
 Steinbrenner, Richard T. (2003). The American Locomotive Company - A Centennial Remembrance. Warren, NJ: On Track Publishers, LLC. 

Diesel engines
Diesel locomotive engines
Marine diesel engines
251